Zaklopac is a village in Croatia.

Population

According to the 2011 census, Zaklopac had 23 inhabitants.

Note: From 1890-1948 it include data for the former settlements of Donji Zaklopac and Gornji Zaklopac.

1991 census

According to the 1991 census, settlement of Zaklopac had 76 inhabitants, which were ethnically declared as all Serbs.

Austro-hungarian 1910 census

According to the 1910 census, settlement of Zaklopac had 544 inhabitants in 3 hamlets, which were linguistically and religiously declared as this:

Literature 

  Savezni zavod za statistiku i evidenciju FNRJ i SFRJ, popis stanovništva 1948, 1953, 1961, 1971, 1981. i 1991. godine.
 Book: "Narodnosni i vjerski sastav stanovništva Hrvatske, 1880-1991: po naseljima, author: Jakov Gelo, izdavač: Državni zavod za statistiku Republike Hrvatske, 1998., ;

References

Populated places in Zadar County
Lika
Serb communities in Croatia